NIST SP 800-90B ("SP" stands for "special publication") is a publication by the National Institute of Standards and Technology with the title Recommendation for the Entropy Sources Used for Random Bit Generation. The publication specifies the design principles and requirements for the entropy sources used by random-bit generators, and the tests for the validation of entropy sources. These entropy sources are intended to be combined with deterministic random-bit generator mechanisms that are specified in NIST SP 800-90A to construct random-bit generators, as specified in NIST SP 800-90C.

As a work of the US Federal Government, NIST SP 800-90B is in the public domain and freely available.

NIST SP 800-90B version history

References

Cryptographically secure pseudorandom number generators
National Institute of Standards and Technology
National Security Agency
Pseudorandom number generators